Denholm is a village in the Canadian province of Saskatchewan within the Rural Municipality of Mayfield No. 406 and Census Division No. 16.

History 
Denholm incorporated as a village on June 25, 1912.

Demographics 

See also 

 List of communities in Saskatchewan
 Villages of Saskatchewan
 Denholm

References

Villages in Saskatchewan
Mayfield No. 406, Saskatchewan
Division No. 16, Saskatchewan